The Laietani were an ancient Iberian (Pre-Roman) people of the Iberian peninsula (the Roman Hispania).  They inhabited the area occupied by the city of Barcelona.  One of the main thoroughfares of the city, Via Laietana, is named after the Laietani. They are believed to have spoken an Iberian language.

The Laietani minted their own coins, which bore the inscription laiesken in northeastern Iberian script that is interpreted in the Iberian language as a self-reference to the ethnic name of that people: from the Laietani or from those of Laie.

Gallery

See also
Iberians
Pre-Roman peoples of the Iberian Peninsula

External links

Detailed map of the Pre-Roman Peoples of Iberia (around 200 BC)

Pre-Roman peoples of the Iberian Peninsula
Ancient peoples of Spain